The Israeli Basketball Premier League Discovery of the Year, or Israeli Basketball Super League Discovery of the Year, is an award given to the best young player of each season of the Israeli Basketball Premier League, which is the top-tier level men's professional basketball league in Israel.

Winners

References

External links
Israeli League Official website
Eurobasket.com Israeli League Page